Mojkovac Municipality (Montenegrin and Serbian: Opština Mojkovac / Општина Мојковац) is one of the municipalities of Montenegro. The municipality is located in northeastern region of Montenegro. Administrative center of the municipality is town of Mojkovac.

Geography and location
Mojkovac is on the west bank of the Tara River, between the mountains of Bjelasica and Sinjajevina. The old mining village of Brskovo is nearby. Brskovo is one of the oldest mines in the region.

The territory of the municipality borders with municipalities: Kolašin, Šavnik, Žabljak, Bijelo Polje and Berane. Mojkovac has a station on Belgrade–Bar railway. It is also at the intersection of the main road connecting Montenegro's coast and Podgorica with northern Montenegro and Serbia (E65, E80), and the road leading towards Žabljak and Pljevlja.

Settlements

Local parliament

|United Montenegro|| 1|| 
|}

Demographics
Town of Mojkovac is administrative centre of Mojkovac municipality, which in 2003 had a population of 10,066. The town of Mojkovac itself has 4,120 citizens.

Ethnic groups (2011 census):
Montenegrins - 5,097 (59.12%)
Serbs - 3,058 (35.47%)
Others and unanswered: 467 (5,42%)

Language (2011 census):: 
Serbian - 4,779 (55,43%)
Montenegrin - 3,331 (38,63%)
Other and unanswered: 512 (5,94%)

Gallery

References 

 
Municipalities of Montenegro